Scopula cavana is a moth of the family Geometridae. It was described by Hamilton Herbert Druce in 1892. It is found in Mexico.

References

Moths described in 1892
cavana
Endemic Lepidoptera of Mexico
Moths of Central America
Taxa named by Hamilton Herbert Druce